Right About Now may refer to:

Right About Now (Ty Herndon album), or the title cover version of the Michael Peterson song (see below)
Right About Now: The Official Sucka Free Mix CD, a 2005 album by Talib Kweli, or the title song
"Right About Now" (song), a 2007 song by Mousse T
"Right About Now", a song by Michael Peterson from Modern Man
"Right About Now", a song by The Mooney Suzuki from People Get Ready
"Right About Now", a song by ScoLoHoFo from Oh!
"Right About Now", a song by Tanya Tucker from What Do I Do with Me

See also
"The Rockafeller Skank", a song by Fatboy Slim often erroneously referred to as Right About Now
Right Now (disambiguation)